Carentan-les-Marais is a commune in the department of Manche, northwestern France.

Geography

Carentan-les-Marais is located in the middle of vast marsh remediated and transformed into rich meadows, at the confluence of the Taute and the Douve. The city, at the gateway to the Cotentin Peninsula and the Bay of Veys, is at the heart of the Regional Natural Park of the Cotentin and Bessin marshes.

Transport

The city has a railway station on the Paris–Cherbourg line and is crossed by the RN 13 and RN 174. It is served by public transport by bus (Manéo) via the line 001 Cherbourg-Octeville - Valognes - Carentan - Saint-Lo. Its port is connected to the sea by a canal.

Toponymy

The name of the commune refers to the marshes of Carentan.

History

The municipality was established on 1 January 2016 by merger of the former communes of Carentan (the seat), Angoville-au-Plain, Houesville, and Saint-Côme-du-Mont. On January 1, 2017, Brévands, Les Veys, and Saint-Pellerin joined the commune of Carentan.
On January 1, 2019, Brucheville, Catz, Montmartin-en-Graignes, Saint-Hilaire-Petitville, and Vierville joined the commune of Carentan.

The communes of Carentan, Angoville-au-Plain, Houesville, Saint-Côme-du-Mont, Brévands, Les Veys, Saint-Pellerin Brucheville, Catz, Montmartin-en-Graignes, Saint-Hilaire-Petitville, and Vierville have become delegated communes.

Population

Education

Sport

Administration

Twinned towns
 Selby, United Kingdom
 Waldfischbach-Burgalben, Germany

See also 
Communes of the Manche department

References

External links

 Carentan les Marais official website 

Communes of Manche
Populated places established in 2016
2016 establishments in France